Walter Kutz (1904 – 1983) was a German art director.

Selected filmography
 Nora (1944)
 Dreaming (1944)
 The Silent Guest (1945)
 And the Heavens Above Us (1947)
 Nights on the Nile (1949)
 The Chaste Libertine (1952)
 When the Heath Dreams at Night (1952)
 The Colourful Dream (1952)
 You Only Live Once (1952)
 The Prince of Pappenheim (1952)
 The Stronger Woman (1953)
 The Dancing Heart (1953)
 The Uncle from America (1953)
 A Life for Do (1954)
 Bon Voyage (1954)
 Consul Strotthoff (1954)
 The Witch (1954)
 Girl with a Future (1954)
 Before God and Man (1955)
 Heaven Is Never Booked Up (1955)
 The Girl from Flanders (1956)
 The Beautiful Master (1956)
 Victor and Victoria (1957)
 Voyage to Italy, Complete with Love (1958)
 Here I Am, Here I Stay (1959)
 The Death Ship (1959)
 What a Woman Dreams of in Springtime (1959)
 The Red Hand (1960)
 Her Most Beautiful Day (1962)
 Room 13 (1964)
 The Curse of the Hidden Vault (1964)
 The Monk with the Whip (1967)
 The Gorilla of Soho (1968)
 The Hound of Blackwood Castle (1968)
 The Man with the Glass Eye (1969)

References

Bibliography
 Langford, Michelle. Directory of World Cinema: Germany. Intellect Books, 2012.

External links

1904 births
1983 deaths
German art directors
Film people from Berlin